Alloa RFC is a rugby union side based in Alloa, Clackmannanshire, Scotland. The club was founded in 1931 as an offshoot of two other clubs:- Clackmannan County RFC and Alloa Academy F.P.

History
The club is Positive Coaching Scotland accredited.

Their new clubhouse was opened in 2019.

Notable former players

Scotland
The following former Alloa players went on to represent Scotland.

Scotland 7s
The following former Alloa players went on to represent Scotland 7s.

North and Midlands
The following former Alloa players have represented North and Midlands at provincial level.

Alloa Sevens 
Alloa play host to the Alloa Sevens tournament.

Honours
 Alloa Sevens
 Champions: 1981
 Stirling University Sevens
 Champions: 1976
 Cambuslang Sevens
 Champions: 1983
 Lanarkshire Sevens
 Champions: 1973
 Waid Academy F.P. Sevens
 Champions: 1971
 Howe of Fife Sevens
 Champions: 1985
Midlands Bowl 
Champions: 2014-15
BT National Bowl 
Champions: 2014-15
Caledonia Division 2
Champions: 2015-16

References

Rugby union in Clackmannanshire
Scottish rugby union teams
Alloa